The Ace Junior Ace is a two-seat sports aircraft that has been offered by the Ace Aircraft Manufacturing Company in kit and plans form for home building since the early 1930s. It was designed by Orland Corben.

An evolution of Corben's single-seat Baby Ace, it is a parasol wing monoplane of conventional taildragger configuration. Pilot and passenger sit side-by-side, in a cockpit that may be enclosed or left open. The fuselage is of fabric-covered tubular construction and the wings are wood.

Experimental Aircraft Association founder Paul Poberezny widened the fuselage of the Jr Ace, added modern wheels, brakes and increased the span to 34 ft to create the Pober Jr Ace. The company Acro Sport maintains the rights to the design, and sells plans so the aircraft can be amateur-built.

Variants
Baby Ace
Single seat 
Super Ace 
Single seat powered by a Ford Model A automotive engine. Plans updated by EAA founder Paul Poberezny.
Ace Junior Ace
Two side-by-side seat variant. 
Pober Jr Ace
Updated plans of the Jr. Ace model

Specifications (Model E)

See also

References

External links

Flying Magazine 1933

Junior Ace
Homebuilt aircraft
1930s United States sport aircraft
Single-engined tractor aircraft
Parasol-wing aircraft
Acro Sport aircraft
Poberezny aircraft